Disney Cinemagic was a European television brand that consisted of a group of television channels owned by Walt Disney Company Limited (UK) plus two programming blocks by Disney Channels Worldwide. It used to be broadcast on most countries in Western Europe; currently, formerly-branded Disney Cinemagic channels in France (Disney Cinema) and the United Kingdom and Ireland (Sky Movies Disney) are run by third parties which primarily airs films by the Walt Disney Studios.

History
 
Disney Cinemagic was launched in the UK and Ireland on 16 March 2006 on BSkyB's premium package. On September 4 2007, the France market version of Disney Cinemagic was launched.

In November 2008 at 8:30pm, Disney Cinemagic HD debuted in France, broadcasting on CANALSAT from 6am to 1am daily, making Disney Cinemagic the first children and family HDTV channel in a French market. In December 2008, Disney Cinemagic HD was launched in the UK with programming in high definition with initial availability through Sky+ HD with a Sky Movies subscription.
In October 2008, Disney Cinemagic Portugal was launched and in January 2009, it launched Disney Cinemagic HD being the first children's channel in Portugal to have an HD feed, with SIC K being the second.

In November 2012, Disney Cinemagic Portugal was replaced by Disney Junior, while its HD feed was rebranded as Disney Movies on Demand.

On 28 March 2013, Disney Cinemagic was replaced in the UK with Sky Movies Disney, as part of a deal between BSkyB and Disney which allowed Sky to stream Disney movies on Sky's video on demand services and the last program on Disney Cinemagic UK was an episode of Lilo & Stitch: The Series. In a similar move in Australia, Foxtel has launched Foxtel Movies Disney in April 2014, along with Disney XD.

Disney Cinemagic in Spain closed in January 2015. Sky rebranded its Sky Movies channels to Sky Cinema, including Sky Movies Disney, in July 2016. On 31 December 2020, Sky Cinema Disney closed.

Duplicating Sky Movies Disney arrangement in the UK, Movistar+ launched Movistar Disney in December 2017. The channel shutdown, films moved to Disney+.

Disney Cinemagic along with all other international Disney Channel, Disney Junior and Disney XD were transferred from Disney–ABC Television Group, half of Disney Media Networks segment, to Disney Direct-to-Consumer and International segment on 14 March 2018.

The last program on Disney Cinemagic Germany was Zenon: Z3 on 30 September 2019, which finished at 11:53 pm. The final Disney Cinemagic, the Germany version, was replaced with Sky Cinema Special on 30 September 2019, thus bringing an end to Disney Cinemagic after 13 years, 6 months, and 2 weeks. The first movie on Sky Cinema Special in Germany was The Greatest Showman at 12am on 1 October 2019.

Versions

Other channels

See also
Foxtel Movies
Sky Cinema
OSN Movies

References

External links
 cinemagic.disney.de
 Sky Cinema Disney, UK channel
 Foxtel Movies Disney, Australia channel
 Disney Cinema, French and Belgium channel

Television channels and stations established in 2006
Disney television networks
Disney Channel
Television channels and stations disestablished in 2019
Former subsidiaries of The Walt Disney Company